Roseimarinus is a Gram-negative, facultatively anaerobic and non-motile genus of bacteria from the family of Prolixibacteraceae with one known species (Roseimarinus sediminis). Roseimarinus sediminis has been isolated from sediments from the coast of Weihai.

References

Bacteroidia
Bacteria genera
Monotypic bacteria genera
Taxa described in 2015